{{DISPLAYTITLE:C21H27NO5}}
The molecular formula C21H27NO5 (molar mass: 373.44 g/mol, exact mass: 373.1889 u) may refer to:

 Hasubanonine
 Spirotetramat

Molecular formulas